Cheops Mountain, is a  mountain summit located in Glacier National Park in the Selkirk Mountains of British Columbia, Canada. Cheops Mountain is situated in the Hermit Range, and the summit provides a good view of the Hermit and Sir Donald Ranges. Its nearest higher peak is Ursus Major Mountain,  to the northwest. Cheops is visible from Highway 1, the Trans-Canada Highway at Rogers Pass.

History

The first ascent of the mountain was made in 1893 by Samuel E. S. Allen and Walter D. Wilcox.

The 1910 Rogers Pass avalanche was the deadliest avalanche in Canadian history, resulting in the deaths of 62 Canadian Pacific Railway workers. In the late afternoon of March 4, 1910, an avalanche swept down the slopes of Cheops, burying the railroad tracks in snow. The men were working to clear the tracks when shortly before midnight the deadly slide hit, coming from the opposite side of the valley down Avalanche Mountain.

The mountain's current name was officially adopted in 1951 when approved by the Geographical Names Board of Canada.  Prior to that it was known as Mount Cheops. The peak was named by Otto Julius Klotz for its resemblance to the Pyramid of Cheops.

Climate

Based on the Köppen climate classification, Cheops Mountain has a subarctic climate with cold, snowy winters, and mild summers. Winter temperatures can drop below −20 °C with wind chill factors below −30 °C. Precipitation runoff from the mountain drains into the Illecillewaet River.

See also

Geography of British Columbia

References

External links
 Weather: Cheops Mountain
 1910 postcard image of Cheops Mountain: University of Alberta

Two-thousanders of British Columbia
Selkirk Mountains
Kootenay Land District